E. africanus may refer to:
 Equus africanus, the African wild ass, a wild member of the horse family
 Eriocephalus africanus, the Cape snow bush, a wild, bushy evergreen shrub species
 Eunotosaurus africanus, a turtle-like reptile that lived around 265 million years ago

See also
 Africanus (disambiguation)